Below is a list of the oldest extant courthouses in the United States.

Active

Former courthouses
The following other old courthouses still standing today exist as museums, for other government functions, or are now privately owned facilities.

By state

Active

Former

See also
List of courthouses in the United States
List of United States federal courthouses
Oldest buildings in the United States

References

Courthouses
Oldest